Guinovart (pronounced ɣinuˈβart in Central Catalan) is a Catalan surname. Notable people with the surname include:

Albert Guinovart (born 1962), Catalan composer and pianist
Josep Guinovart (1927–2007), Spanish Catalan painter

Catalan-language surnames